Sjur Johnsen (20 June 1891 – 2 October 1978) was a Norwegian wrestler. He was born in Vik. He competed at the 1920 Summer Olympics in Antwerp where he placed fourth in Greco-Roman middleweight, after losing the bronze match to Masa Perttilä. He was a national champion in 1920 and 1922.

References

1891 births
1978 deaths
People from Vik
Olympic wrestlers of Norway
Wrestlers at the 1920 Summer Olympics
Norwegian male sport wrestlers
Sportspeople from Vestland